Chalciporus (formerly Boletus) piperatoides is a small pored mushroom of the family Boletaceae found in woodland in  North America. It closely resembles Chalciporus piperatus but can be distinguished by its flesh and pores staining blue after cutting or bruising. It has a less peppery taste.

See also
List of North American boletes

References

Chalciporus
Edible fungi
Fungi of North America
Fungi described in 1971